Syzygium manii is a species of plant in the family Myrtaceae. It is endemic to the Andaman Islands.  It is threatened by habitat loss.

References

manii
Flora of the Andaman Islands
Taxonomy articles created by Polbot